Edgar John "Ben" Benson ,  (May 28, 1923 – September 2, 2011) was a Canadian politician, businessman,  diplomat, and university professor. He held four cabinet posts, most notably that of Minister of Finance under Pierre Trudeau, where he was instrumental in reforming Canada's income tax law. He was described as "Pierre Trudeau's unflappable finance minister, the pipe-smoking financial wizard who raised the ire of corporate Canada in the 1970s by bringing in a capital gains tax."

Early years
After serving overseas in the Second World War as a sergeant in the Royal Regiment of Canadian Artillery, Benson attended Queen's University in Kingston, Ontario, where he obtained his Bachelor of Commerce degree. He became a chartered accountant and partner in the accounting firm of England, Leonard, Macpherson and Company, and co-owner of CKLC. Prior to his entry into politics, he also taught Business Administration at Queen's, in the capacity of Assistant Professor of Commerce.

Political life
He was first elected to the House of Commons of Canada in the 1962 general election as the Liberal Member of Parliament (MP) for Kingston, Ontario. Initially appointed in 1962 as Parliamentary Secretary to then Minister of Finance Walter Gordon, he entered the Cabinet of Prime Minister Lester Pearson in 1964 as Minister of National Revenue, and served concurrently from 1966 to 1968 as the first President of the Treasury Board.

He was an early supporter of Pierre Trudeau in the 1968 Liberal leadership campaign to replace the retiring Pearson, and, together with Jean Marchand, was co-chairman of Trudeau's leadership bid. He was later appointed Minister of Finance, serving from 1968 to 1972.

Tax reform (1971)
Benson's balanced budget for 1969-70 would be the last until Paul Martin's budget of 1997-98. Later in 1969, he introduced his white paper on Canadian tax reform, which paved the way for:

 a capital gains tax
 a tax deduction for child care as a means of helping mothers enter the workforce
 greater use of Registered Retirement Savings Plans

The proposals were subjected to intensive debate that lasted more than a year. Those concerning the capital gains tax were severely criticized by the business community, particularly Israel Asper, who condemned the measure. The reforms were only passed after significant amendment, and even then only through the use of closure. They came into effect on January 1, 1972, as prescribed by the 1971 Canadian federal budget

Marc Lalonde, a colleague and future Finance Minister, later said, "He was in finance at a critical time, he revolutionized the system. He launched a revolution. It was a revolution, a necessary step and a demanding task. What he did was economically justified. The basic tax structure that he put in place is still alive. No one has really touched it since."

Impact
He was also instrumental in rolling out a national medical care plan and supplementary old age pensions and played a key role in federal-provincial relations.

Benson wore a pair of new shoes on budget day in 1968, although he said, "He didn't buy them just for the budget." The following year he did not wear new shoes when delivering the budget, saying jokingly that he couldn't afford them, and in 1970 proudly displayed his worn soles on budget day.

He later served as Minister of National Defence from January to August 1972, when he retired from politics, choosing not to run in the 1972 election.

Later life and death
Benson served as President of the Canadian Transport Commission from 1972 to 1982, and as Canadian Ambassador to Ireland from 1982 to 1985. He died on September 2, 2011 at the age of 88.

Honours
Benson was conferred honorary degrees as a Doctor of Laws from:

 Royal Military College of Canada in 1973
 Queen's University in 2008

Electoral record

Kingston

Kingston and the Islands

Further reading

References

External links 

 
 
 

1923 births
2011 deaths
Canadian Ministers of Finance
Defence ministers of Canada
Canadian Protestants
Liberal Party of Canada MPs
Members of the 19th Canadian Ministry
Members of the 20th Canadian Ministry
Members of the House of Commons of Canada from Ontario
Members of the King's Privy Council for Canada
Royal Regiment of Canadian Artillery personnel
Members of the United Church of Canada
People from Kingston, Ontario
Queen's University at Kingston alumni
Academic staff of the Queen's University at Kingston
People from Cobourg
Ambassadors of Canada to Ireland
Canadian Army personnel of World War II
Canadian Army soldiers